Mexico offers social welfare assistance designed to meet needs of the Mexican population including assistance for low-income populations, young people, the elderly, and people with disabilities. Mexico has been offering social welfare since 1999. Despite the fact that Mexico offers welfare to its citizens through various programs, the poverty level in Mexico is currently at 46.2%. More than 10% of those living in poverty are living in extreme poverty, earning $1.25/ day or less.

For low-income families
In Mexico, the social welfare program for low-income families was originally known as "Oportunidades", meaning "opportunities". It was eventually renamed "Prospera", meaning "to prosper". The program was established in 1997 and was designed to encourage families to send their children to school and health centres. Nearly six million families have benefited from this program. The goal of the “Prospera” program is to improve the quality of life of the poor in terms of nutrition, education, and health. The program is still available to date for Mexican citizens in need of assistance. In particular, it is highlighted on the Mexican government website for people who are affected by natural disasters and other emergencies.

Another program created to help low-income families was the FIDELIST. This program was created in 1984 and essentially subsidized the prices of corn tortillas. It ran until 1990 when it was replaced by the Tortilla sin Costo, which provided subsidized or free tortillas for 2.1 million low-income families and equaled approximately 3% of Mexico’s total corn consumption. However, the current tortillas program for low-income people in Mexico, as offered by the Mexican government, is to provide a two-year loan at 6% interest to set up a tortilla business; there are no 'free tortillas' for the poor.

Social welfare for children 

Children in Mexico can also apply for social welfare, depending on their circumstances. One protection available to them is the DIF (Desarrollo Integral de la Familia), which is a program for family services that are state-run. Children can also benefit from the Prospera program (formerly known as Oportunidades) as mentioned above. According to a study by IFPRI, the International Food Policy Research Institute, Prospera has positively improved factors such as school enrollment, health appointment attendance, and children’s nutrition. For example, enrollment in school for Prospera children has increased significantly, with girls increasing by 20% and boys increasing by 10%. Some recent program advances have refocused assistance toward children in both rural and urban areas; originally, it was only set up to serve rural children. Now, more children have access to this assistance. Overall, the social welfare of children has been improved by these measures.

For the elderly and disabled 
Other groups that are eligible to receive social welfare assistance in Mexico are the elderly and the disabled. The pension age in Mexico is 65 years. The amount given in the pension varies depending on how much the person contributed to the pension program. Pensions are usually 2,253.76 pesos a month. People with disabilities are also given pensions. The average pension for a disabled individual is roughly 2,253.76 pesos a month.

Prospera history 
An evolution of the Oportunidades social welfare programme has, in its various forms, given conditional cash transfers (CCTs) to Mexico’s poorest since the 1990s. The scheme, originally called Pronasol in 1989, before being renamed Progresa in 1997 and Oportunidades in 2002, was the first major social programme of its kind in Latin America. The programme gave poor families cash in exchange for their meeting conditions such as enrolling their children in school and getting regular health check-ups. It went on to inspire other similar schemes across Latin America, including Brazil’s Bolsa Família – perhaps the most well-known and successful of them all.

References 

Welfare in Mexico